The 2018-19 FC Barcelona B season was the 48th competitive season that the club had played. Competing in Group 3 of the Segunda División B under García Pimienta and finishing 8th place.

References

Spanish football clubs 2018–19 season
FC Barcelona Atlètic seasons